John Ronald Curro  (6 December 1932 – 6 November 2019) was an Australian violinist, violist, conductor and music director.

Curro was the founder (1966) and Director of Music of the Queensland Youth Orchestras, with which he established the National Youth Concerto Competition (NYCC).

Honours and awards
Curro was appointed a Member of the Order of the British Empire in 1981 and a Member of the Order of Australia in 1995.

He was awarded the Centenary Medal in 2001.

Bernard Heinze Memorial Award
The Sir Bernard Heinze Memorial Award is given to a person who has made an outstanding contribution to music in Australia.

! 
|-
| 2000 || John Curro || Sir Bernard Heinze Memorial Award ||  || 
|-

Don Banks Music Award
The Don Banks Music Award was established in 1984 to publicly honour a senior artist of high distinction who has made an outstanding and sustained contribution to music in Australia. It was founded by the Australia Council in honour of Don Banks, Australian composer, performer and the first chair of its music board.

|-
| 2002
| John Curro
| Don Banks Music Award
| 
|-

Queensland Greats Awards
The Queensland Greats Awards commenced in 2001 and recognise outstanding Queenslanders for their years of dedication and contribution to the development of the state and their role in strengthening and shaping the community in Queensland, Australia.

! 
|-
| 2016
| John Curro
| Queensland Greats Awards
| 
| 
|-

References

External Links 

 John Curro digital story and oral history, State Library of Queensland

1932 births
2019 deaths
Australian classical violinists
Australian classical violists
Australian conductors (music)
21st-century conductors (music)
Members of the Order of Australia
Australian Members of the Order of the British Empire
Recipients of the Centenary Medal
Queensland Greats
21st-century violists